Kentucky Route 777 (KY 777) is a   state highway in Kentucky. KY 680's southern terminus is at KY 80 in Garrett, and the northern terminus is at KY 2554 west of Langley

Major intersections

References

0777
Transportation in Floyd County, Kentucky